The California Cougars were an indoor soccer team, founded in 2004. The team was a charter member of the Professional Arena Soccer League (PASL-Pro), the first division of arena (indoor) soccer in North America.

They played their home matches at the Stockton Arena in Stockton, California.  Their team colors were red, gold and black. The team's head coach was Antonio Sutton.

History
In February 2004, John Thomas, a real estate developer, purchased an expansion team in the Major Indoor Soccer League for Stockton, California.  The team was named the California Cougars so that it would represent all of northern California as a regional team.

The first general manager was Dennis Lukens, a former "A" League GM who oversaw the start up operation. He was succeeded by Emily Ballus, a former executive with the WUSA. Because it is only 40 miles south of Sacramento, the team hoped to draw fans of the old Sacramento Knights of the CISL and WISL. The team began play in the 2005–2006 season after the construction of its arena. In August 2006, the team was purchased by Rick and Greg Toy and their brother in-law Jim Rachels.

In May 2008, the team announced that it was joining the Professional Arena Soccer League and would be renamed the Stockton Cougars. In April 2009, local businessman Fred Walke purchased majority interest in the franchise. For the 2009–2010 season Stockton Cougars went back to calling itself California Cougars.

Year-by-year

Playoff record

Coaches

Head coaches
  Troy Dayak (2005–2007)
  Bernie Lilavois (2007–2009)
  Antonio Sutton (2009–2011)

Assistant coaches
  Dennis Lukens (2005–2006)
  Antonio Sutton (2007–2009)
  Aaron Susi (2008–2011)

Arenas
 Stockton Arena (2005–2011)

References

External links
 Cougars official website
 PASL-Pro website

Soccer clubs in California
Association football clubs established in 2004
Defunct indoor soccer clubs in the United States
Sports in Stockton, California
Defunct Professional Arena Soccer League teams
Indoor soccer clubs in the United States
Major Indoor Soccer League (2001–2008) teams
2004 establishments in California
2011 disestablishments in California
Association football clubs disestablished in 2011